Davy Jones's locker is a metaphor for the oceanic abyss, the final resting place of drowned sailors and travellers. It is a euphemism for drowning or shipwrecks in which the sailors' and ships' remains are consigned to the depths of the ocean (to be sent to Davy Jones' Locker).

The origins of the name of Davy Jones, the sailors' devil, are unclear, with a 19th-century dictionary tracing Davy Jones to a "ghost of Jonah". Other explanations of this nautical superstition have been put forth, including an incompetent sailor or a pub owner who kidnapped sailors.

History
The earliest known reference of the negative connotation of Davy Jones occurs in the Four Years Voyages of Capt. George Roberts, by author Daniel Defoe, published in 1726 in London.

An early description of Davy Jones occurs in Tobias Smollett's The Adventures of Peregrine Pickle, published in 1751:

In the story, Jones is described as having saucer eyes, three rows of teeth, horns, a tail, and blue smoke coming from his nostrils.

Proposed origins of the tale
The origin of the tale of Davy Jones is unclear, and many conjectural or folkloric explanations have been told:
The Dictionary of the Vulgar Tongue by Francis Grose, written in 1785 and published in 1811, includes the definitions: "DAVID JONES. The devil, the spirit of the sea: called Necken or Draugr in the north countries, such as Norway, Denmark, and Sweden" and "DAVID JONES' LOCKER. The sea".
Written within a foreign affairs segment within the newspaper 'Chester Chronicle' in 1791, the term 'Safe in Davy Jones's locker' was used to convey that a person was lost, therefore to be within Davy Jones' locker was to be lost at sea.
The 1898 Dictionary of Phrase and Fable connects Davy to the West-Indian duppy (duffy) and Jones to biblical Jonah: 
David Jones, a real pirate, although not a very well-known one, living on the Indian Ocean in the 1630s.
Duffer Jones, a notoriously myopic sailor who often found himself overboard.
A British pub owner who supposedly threw drunken sailors into his ale locker and then gave them to be drafted on any ship.
Linguists consider it most plausible that Davy was inspired by Saint David of Wales, whose name was often invoked by Welsh sailors, and Jones by the Biblical Jonah.

Reputation

Not all traditions dealing with Davy Jones are fearful. In traditions associated with sailors crossing the Equatorial line, there is a "raucous and rowdy" initiation presided over by those who have crossed the line before, known as shellbacks, or Sons of Neptune. The eldest shellback is called King Neptune, and Davy Jones is to be re-enacted as his first assistant.

Use in media

19th century
in 1812, a musical pantomime 'Davy Jones's Locker, Or Black ey'd Susan' was performed at London's West End theatre; Sans Pereil, known today as Adelphi Theatre.

20th century

Theodore Sturgeon's short story, "Mailed Through a Porthole" (1938), about a doomed freighter, takes the form of a letter addressed to "Mr. David Jones, Esq., Forty Fathoms."

The 1959 Broadway musical Davy Jones' Locker with Bil Baird's marionettes had a two-week run at the Morosco Theatre.

In the 1960s television series The Monkees episode "Hitting The High Seas", the character Davy Jones (played by musician Davy Jones) receives special treatment while kidnapped in a ship as he claims to be related to "The Original" Davy Jones, his grandfather. Meanwhile, his fellow band members are held hostage, leading to various humorous situations. The fact that Jones the musician shared a name with the legendary seafarer has itself led to a number of puns swapping the two in the decades that followed.

In the cartoon "The Haunted Ship", from the Aesop's Fables series produced by the Van Beuren animation studios, Davy Jones is depicted as a living skeleton wearing a pirate's bicorne hat.

Davy Jones is a character appearing in Popeye comics authored by Tom Sims and Bela Zaboly. He is depicted as a sea spirit who inhabits the bottom of the ocean as well as his Locker, which is located in a sunken ship. Although he has opposed Popeye in the past, both masters of the sea have grown mostly friendly towards each other. The being appears as an old pirate with a white beard, eyepatch, peg leg and hook.

Raymond Z. Gallun's science fiction story "Davey Jones' Ambassador" (Astounding Stories, December 1935) tells the story of a deep-sea explorer in his underwater capsule who comes in contact on the seabed with a deep-sea culture of underwater creatures that resemble a mixture of sharks and crabs.

21st century
The concept of Davy Jones was combined with the legend of the Flying Dutchman in the Pirates of the Caribbean film series, in which Davy Jones' Locker is portrayed as a purgatory place of punishment for those who crossed Davy Jones. Jones is portrayed as a captain assigned to ferry those drowned at sea to the afterlife before he corrupted his purpose out of anger at his betrayal by his lover, the sea-goddess Calypso. Davy Jones is portrayed in the movie as an enigma of the sea, featuring octopus tentacles for a beard and crab claw for a hand.

The phrase has often been referenced comedically in the animated television series SpongeBob SquarePants, particularly by the show's ghostly personification of the Flying Dutchman. "Davy Jones's locker" has made occasional appearances in the cartoon as a physical gym locker used to contain souls, including once alongside former Monkees band member Davy Jones.

French singer Nolwenn Leroy recorded a song titled "Davy Jones" for her 2012 album Ô Filles de l'Eau. The English version contains the lines: "Davy Jones, oh Davy Jones / Where they gonna rest your bones / Down in the deep blue sea / Down in the deep blue sea..."

See also
 Fiddler's Green
 Flying Dutchman
 Rán

Notes

References

1720s neologisms
Metaphors
Maritime folklore
Superstitions
Supernatural legends
Fictional places in Disney films